Efere Ozako (1967—2013) was an entertainment lawyer from Delta State, Nigeria, who gained public attention through his Wetin Lawyers Dey Do Sef? initiative. He advocated the need to engage lawyers in business agreements, as well as the need to protect intellectual rights of artists in the Nigerian entertainment industry. He died at age 46 in April 2013.

See also
12th Africa Movie Academy Awards

References

1967 births
2013 deaths
People from Delta State
Nigerian entertainment lawyers